Uplands nation (the Uppland Nation) is a student society and one of thirteen nations at Uppsala University. It has traditionally recruited its members from the province of Uppland, which surrounds and includes Uppsala and stretches down south to the northern part of Stockholm. The nation uses an older spelling of the toponym (but Upplands nation has also been used). , the nation has about 2,600 members.

History and building
In its earliest form, Uplands nation was founded, or may at least first be attested, in 1642, but the current nation is the result of a merger in 1823 with Fjärdhundra nation and a  second one in 1829 with Roslags nation, two smaller nations recruiting students from different parts of the province of Uppland (Fjärdhundraland and Roslagen), each of which also date to the early 1640s (the earliest documents from Fjärdhundra nation are also from 1642, while the archives from Roslags nation begin already in 1640).

Before acquiring the current nation building (1825), the nation held its meetings either in the house of its inspector – the professor who had been appointed by the university to guard over the virtue and behaviour of the students of a particular nation – or in the home of one of its members. The steadily increasing size of the library forced the nation to start renting space in 1763, but as late as 1814, the protocol mentions a meeting in the home of the member "J. Almquist", i.e. the later notable writer Carl Jonas Love Almqvist.

The current building of the nation was built by the master turner Peter Strandman after a fire in 1809, but some of the walls date to sometime before 1770. It was acquired by the nation in 1825. The nation had previously owned the neighbouring plot for a few years, but sold this to Västmanlands-Dala nation.

In the 1950s a new wing was added according to the design of the architect Sten Hummel-Gumælius. The garden of the nation includes sculptures by Carl Milles and Carl Eldh. On the garden wall along the street Sysslomansgatan is a plaque with a medallion (based on the portrait by Johan Tobias Sergel) in the memory of the poet Anna Maria Lenngren, who grew up in a house once standing there. This wing contains twenty student rooms; another thirty are located in a different house two blocks away.

Notable people

Former curators (chairmen) of the nation include the chemist and later Nobel laureate Svante Arrhenius and the later Secretary General of the U.N. and Nobel peace laureate Dag Hammarskjöld. Other members have included the songwriter Prince Gustaf, the Duke of Uppland, a central figure in Uppsala student life in the 1840s who died young in 1852, the philosopher Pontus Wikner, and the writer C. J. L. Almqvist, already mentioned above. The diplomat Hans Blix, who studied Law in Uppsala, was director for the theatre society of Uplands nation for a year. Among the inspectors (University-appointed faculty members whose task it is to supervise the nation's activities) can be mentioned Nathan Söderblom, Archbishop of the Church of Sweden and recipient of the Nobel Peace Prize.

An important part in the lore of the nation is played by a young boy who never actually matriculated in the nation: Svante Wijkman, who was born in a local bourgeois family and died 1837, during his last year in the Cathedral School in Uppsala. After his premature death, his mother donated scholarships both to the school and to the nation, which her son presumably would have joined in the near future if he had lived. A posthumous portrait of young Wijkman accompanied the donation.

Ignorance of the - easily verifiable - real identity of the boy in the picture among members has led speculations about his early death being the result of too much partying and he has been claimed to haunt the nation. Besides the Wijkman room (Wijkmanska rummet) where the portrait hangs, other institutions of the nation have been named after him, including a brass band (Wijkmanska blecket), a pub (Svantes källare) and a café (Café Wijkman).

Inspektors
Roslags nation

Fjärdhundra nation

 Uplands nation

Notes

References and further reading
All references are in Swedish
Eugène Lewenhaupt, Anteckningar om Uplands nation i Upsala före 1830, Upsala, 1877.
Isidor Carlsson, Uplands nation 1800-1914: En skildring, Uppsala: Upplands nation 1915.
Isidor Carlsson, "Upplands nations hus", in Albin Roosval (ed.), Nationshusen i Uppsala. Illustrerade skildringar af flera författare, E. Lundquist: Stockholm 1915, p. 19-36.
Studenten, staden och sanningen: bilder och essayer: utgivna med anledning av Uplands nations 350-årsjubileum, Bengt Erik Rydén (ed.), Uppsala: Uplands nation 1992. (Published for the 350th anniversary of the nation)
Svedberg, Theodor (The), "Arrhenius, Svante", Svenskt biografiskt lexikon, vol. 2, p. 287-301.

External links
Uplands nation

Nations at Uppsala University
Uppland
Student organizations established in the 17th century